Lauren Brooke Frucci ( Thompson; born July 29, 1982) is an American television personality, print model and voiceover actor who worked for Golf Channel, mostly as a co-host on "Morning Drive", (from 2010–2020) the channel's daily morning show. She has been a host of "Top Ten", the "College Sports Minute" and is currently a host for GolfNow (formerly "Destination Golf"). She is also known for having worked for Total Nonstop Action Wrestling (TNA) as a backstage interviewer.

Career

Thompson has modeled, represented companies as a spokesmodel and done voice-overs. She has appeared in various television commercials, many television shows, and music videos. She has appeared at conventions across the United States and accepts national bookings through her website as a spokesperson, print model and voiceover talent. She appeared in the music video for Jason Aldean's song "Hicktown", and for Sevendust's song "Praise". She also has been on Southeastern Conference rivalries on SEC websites. She modeled under the name Lauren Brooke early in her career.

Total Nonstop Action Wrestling (2007–2009)
Thompson was hired by Total Nonstop Action Wrestling (TNA) as a backstage interviewer, along with Jeremy Borash, for TNA's primary television program TNA Impact!, and for their monthly pay-per-view events.

Eventually, her character became involved in numerous angles during her interactions with TNA talent. The Beautiful People, as part of their arrogant Barbie gimmick, often taunted her in various ways during interviews. After a series of interviews, the mentally unstable Abyss began thinking of her as his girlfriend, leading to Lauren attempting to help him in his feud with Matt Morgan. She then assumed a more active role in the feud between Abyss, Dr. Stevie Richards, and Daffney, which also briefly involved Raven. The latter program also involved Taylor Wilde, who was established as Lauren's (kayfabe) best friend and sorority sister. Lauren became physically involved in a match for the first time at Victory Road by attacking Daffney.

On December 17, 2009, it was reported that Thompson was leaving TNA to focus on her job with the Golf Channel. Her absence from TNA programming was explained on the "New Year's Knockout Eve 2010" broadcast as being "fired" by TNA Management, having assaulted Lacey Von Erich on the December 17 episode of Impact!.

Personal life
On October 11, 2009, Thompson announced her engagement to long-time friend and fellow UCF student, Richard Frucci. They were married on January 23, 2010.

On July 29, 2013, during the last segment of the program Morning Drive, while being wished a happy 31st birthday by the other cast members, Thompson announced she was pregnant with her first child. The couple have two sons together, born in January 2014, and in July 2017.

References

External links

Official Bio
 

1982 births
American women television personalities
Golf writers and broadcasters
Living people
People from Orlando, Florida
Professional wrestling announcers
University of Central Florida alumni
Television personalities from Florida